Cedric Moodie (born November 20, 1978) is an American professional basketball player who last played for the Brampton A's of the National Basketball League of Canada (NBL). He was an NBL Canada All-Star in 2014 and earned All-League honors for the 2013–14 season. Moodie has experience playing in multiple countries across the world outside of Canada, primarily Argentina. He played college basketball at Ball State for three years and capped his amateur career representing the University of Indianapolis.

References

External links 
 IBL profile
 FIBA.com profile

1978 births
Living people
American expatriate basketball people in Argentina
American expatriate basketball people in Canada
American men's basketball players
Ball State Cardinals men's basketball players
Basketball players from South Bend, Indiana
Boca Juniors basketball players
Brampton A's players
Halifax Rainmen players
Indianapolis Greyhounds men's basketball players
Lanús basketball players
Laval Kebs players
Quilmes de Mar del Plata basketball players
Shooting guards